Onsu Station is a station on the Seoul Subway Line 1. It was the former western terminus of Seoul Subway Line 7. A westward extension of Line 7 (from Onsu to Bupyeong-gu Office) was completed in October 2012. It is near the border of Seoul and Bucheon.

Station layout

Line 1

Line 7

Vicinity

Exit 1: St. Peter's School
Exit 2: Ojeong Elementary School
Exit 3: Sungkonghoe University
Exit 4: Yuhan College
Exit 5: Donggok Elementary School
Exit 8: Oryu Elementary School, Wooshin Middle & High Schools

References

Seoul Metropolitan Subway stations
Metro stations in Guro District, Seoul
Railway stations opened in 1988